Before 1902, the southern part of Africa that is now South Africa was under the hegemony of Great Britain. There also were two self-proclaimed independent states: Transvaal (also known as the South African Republic), and the Orange Free State. The British and the Boers fought two wars, known as the First Boer War (1880–1881) and the Second Boer War (1899–1902); after the second war, in which the British prevailed, both republics were incorporated into the British Empire. On May 31, 1910, the two ex-republics and the British colonies of the Cape and Natal formed the Union of South Africa, a self-governing dominion of the British Empire.

The United States appointed its first envoy to South Africa, Ralph J. Totten, in 1929. He was appointed as Minister Resident/Consul General and promoted to Envoy Extraordinary and Minister Plenipotentiary the following year.

South Africa was renamed the Republic of South Africa on May 31, 1961 after links to the British crown were severed.

Ambassadors

Note: The ambassadors were commissioned to the Union of South Africa until 1961 when South Africa became a republic.

Notes

See also
Embassy of South Africa, Washington, D.C.
South Africa – United States relations
Foreign relations of South Africa
Ambassadors of the United States

References
United States Department of State: Background notes on South Africa

External links
 United States Department of State: Chiefs of Mission for South Africa
 United States Department of State: South Africa
 United States Embassy in Pretoria

South Africa
Main
United States